Khanom chan is an ancient Thai khanom, or dessert, made of tapioca flour, rice flour, and coconut milk, among other ingredients. Originating from the Sukhothai Period, the dessert is a staple snack in Thai cuisine, and Thai people usually prepare it for auspicious ceremonies. 

Khanom chan is fragrant, subtly sweet, and slightly oily from the addition of the coconut milk; its texture is smooth yet sticky.

Name and origin 
Its name derives from two Thai words: “khanom” meaning "dessert", and “chan” meaning "layer" or "layers". 

The dessert has its origins in the Sukhothai Period, when foreign trade with China and India contributed to cultural exchanges, including that of food. As a result, the food was developed from ingredients that came from many nations and was adapted to suit the living conditions of local people.

Usage 
In a complete serving, a minimum of nine layers of the dessert are prepared and eaten. The number nine has connotations of prosperity in the Thai language: "nine" is a homophone of the phrase "to step forward". As a result, khanom chan is often seen as representing prosperity in life and promotion in one's occupation.   

Because of its positive connotations, khanom chan is often used in sacred ceremonies such as in home philanthropy or weddings; with nine layers or more the snack is believed to bring happiness and progress for both the maker and eater. 

Because of this belief, some areas of Thailand have given the dessert other names to make it more prosperous, such as khanom chan farh.

Ingredients 
Khanom chan is made with tapioca flour, arrowroot starch, rice flour, mung bean flour, sugar, coconut milk, and food coloring or pandan juice.

Tapioca flour is used to make the dessert soft, sticky, viscous, and transparent. Arrowroot starch makes the dessert more sticky, but is less transparent than tapioca flour. Rice flour and mung bean flour give it firmness to hold its shape.

See also
 Kue lapis, a similar Indonesian kue (dessert)
 Thai cuisine
 List of Thai desserts
 List of Thai dishes (includes names in Thai script)
 List of Thai ingredients (includes names in Thai script)

References

Thai desserts and snacks